Really Nice Guys is an extended play by Philadelphian musician, Ron Gallo. The album was released on January 19, 2018, through New West Records.

Track listing

References 

2018 EPs
Ron Gallo albums
New West Records albums